Edson Ramos Silva (born May 31, 1986, in João Pessoa), nicknamed Ratinho, is a Brazilian football player currently playing as a right back for Joinville.

His nickname "Ratinho", meaning "little mouse", followed him since his childhood. As an official nickname on his football shirt, it was initiated in 2007 by his mentor at AEK – and his manager since then – Rivaldo, who had an AEK shirt decorated with the name "Edson Ratinho" and offered it to Ramos; ever since then he appears under this name.

Club career

AEK Athens

In 2007, he moved to the Greek Super League side AEK Athens for €350K. He scored for his new side in a match against Levadiakos FC. Having started his second season at AEK, he asked in October 2008 to leave and immediately departed to Brazil. In January 2009 he brought AEK an offer, thus transferring initially to his late club Mogi Mirim for €350K  and subsequently (February 2009) moving on to Uzbekistan and the FC Bunyodkor, following the footsteps of his manager and teammate at AEK Rivaldo, who had taken the same route from AEK to Bunyodkor six months earlier.

RCD Mallorca
Edson Ramos initially joined RCD Mallorca on trial along with fellow-Brazilian João Victor, playing in Mallorca's team Laudrup make them in the start squad. before Mallorca confirmed both had signed five-year deals on August 26, 2010.

Career statistics

Honours
Bunyodkor
Uzbek League: 2009
Joinville
Brazilian Série B: 2014
Copa Santa Catarina: 2020
Recopa Catarinense: 2021
CRB
Campeonato Alagoano: 2017

References

External links
Edson Ratinho at Footballzz

1986 births
Living people
Association football wingers
Brazilian footballers
Brazilian expatriate footballers
Mogi Mirim Esporte Clube players
AEK Athens F.C. players
FC Bunyodkor players
RCD Mallorca players
São Paulo FC players
Sport Club Internacional players
Associação Desportiva São Caetano players
Joinville Esporte Clube players
Paysandu Sport Club players
Clube de Regatas Brasil players
Esporte Clube São Bento players
Super League Greece players
La Liga players
Campeonato Brasileiro Série A players
Campeonato Brasileiro Série B players
Campeonato Brasileiro Série C players
Campeonato Brasileiro Série D players
Uzbekistan Super League players
Brazilian expatriate sportspeople in Greece
Brazilian expatriate sportspeople in Uzbekistan
Brazilian expatriate sportspeople in Spain
Expatriate footballers in Greece
Expatriate footballers in Uzbekistan
Expatriate footballers in Spain